The Akhilesh Yadav ministry was the Council of Ministers in the 16th Uttar Pradesh Legislative Assembly headed by Chief Minister Akhilesh Yadav.

The ministry was formed after the 2012 Uttar Pradesh Legislative Assembly election, in which the Samajwadi Party under the leadership of Mulayam Singh Yadav & Akhilesh Yadav won the election.

Cabinet Ministers

Minister of State

Ministers of State (Independent Charge)

See also
 First Yogi Adityanath ministry
 Third Mulayam Singh ministry
 First Narayan Dutt Tiwari ministry
 Second Narayan Dutt Tiwari ministry
 Third Narayan Dutt Tiwari ministry
 Fourth Narayan Dutt Tiwari ministry
 Vir Bahadur Singh ministry
 First Mayawati ministry
 Second Mayawati ministry
 Third Mayawati ministry

References

 Cabinet Ministers in Uttar Pradesh Government 
 Ministers Of State (Independent Charge) Of U.P. Government

Akhilesh
Samajwadi Party
2012 establishments in Uttar Pradesh
Cabinets established in 2012
2017 disestablishments in India
Cabinets disestablished in 2017